Rubens is a crater on Mercury.  Its name was adopted by the International Astronomical Union (IAU) in 1979, after Flemish painter Peter Paul Rubens.

The crater Monteverdi is to the north of Rubens.  Stravinsky is to the south and Duccio is to the east.

References

Impact craters on Mercury